Salmacis or Salmakis was a town of ancient Caria. While the famed fountain appears in Strabo, the town is only mentioned in inscriptions. It was a polis (city-state) and a member of the Delian League.
 
Its site is unlocated.

References

Populated places in ancient Caria
Former populated places in Turkey
Greek city-states
Members of the Delian League
Lost ancient cities and towns